The Spring River Bridge, is a historic bridge carrying Riverview Drive over the Spring River south of Mammoth Spring, Arkansas. The bridge rests on concrete abutments and piers. The bridge was built in 1916 by H. B. Walton as part of a county effort to improve its road infrastructure and is a well-preserved local example of early concrete bridge construction.

The bridge was listed on the National Register of Historic Places in 2014.

See also
National Register of Historic Places listings in Fulton County, Arkansas
List of bridges on the National Register of Historic Places in Arkansas

References

Road bridges on the National Register of Historic Places in Arkansas
Bridges completed in 1916
National Register of Historic Places in Fulton County, Arkansas
Girder bridges in the United States
Concrete bridges in the United States
1916 establishments in Arkansas
Transportation in Fulton County, Arkansas